1051 Merope  is a dark Alauda asteroid from the outermost region of the asteroid belt, approximately  in diameter. It was discovered on 16 September 1925, by German astronomer Karl Reinmuth at the Heidelberg-Königstuhl State Observatory in Heidelberg, Germany, and given the provisional designation . Reinmuth named it after the nymph Merope from Greek mythology. The asteroid has a rotation period of 27.2 hours.

Orbit and classification 

Merope is a member of the Alauda family, a large family of carbonaceous asteroids and named after its parent body, 702 Alauda.

It orbits the Sun in the outermost asteroid belt at a distance of 2.9–3.5 AU once every 5 years and 9 months (2,105 days; semi-major axis of 3.21 AU). Its orbit has an eccentricity of 0.10 and an inclination of 24° with respect to the ecliptic.

The body's observation arc begins at Heidelberg in October 1925, or three weeks after its official discovery observation.

Physical characteristics 

Merope has been characterized as a primitive P-type asteroid by the Wide-field Infrared Survey Explorer (WISE), and as a common carbonaceous C-type asteroid by Pan-STARRS photometric survey.

Rotation period 

In March 2009, a rotational lightcurve of Merope was obtained from photometric observations by astronomers at the Oakley Southern Sky Observatory in Australia. Lightcurve analysis gave a rotation period of 27.2 hours with a brightness variation of 0.20 magnitude. In October 2012, astronomers at the Palomar Transient Factory in California measured a period 13.717 hours with an amplitude of 0.11 magnitude in the R-band, which seems to be an alternative period solution (1:2 alias) of what the Australian astronomers had previously measured. Previous observations by Gino Farroni and by Federico Manzini from 2004 and 2005, respectively, have been provisional and of poor quality.

Diameter and albedo 

According to the surveys carried out by the Infrared Astronomical Satellite IRAS, the Japanese Akari satellite and the NEOWISE mission of NASA's WISE telescope, Merope measures between 60.439 and 74.36 kilometers in diameter and its surface has an albedo between 0.03 and 0.053.

The Collaborative Asteroid Lightcurve Link derives an albedo of 0.0358 and a diameter of 67.11 kilometers based on an absolute magnitude of 10.1.

Naming 

This minor planet was named after the nymph Merope from Greek mythology. She is one of the seven Pleiades, daughters of the Titan Atlas and the sea-nymph Pleione. The star Merope in the Pleiades star cluster is named for the same.

References

External links 
 Asteroid Lightcurve Database (LCDB), query form (info )
 Dictionary of Minor Planet Names, Google books
 Asteroids and comets rotation curves, CdR – Observatoire de Genève, Raoul Behrend
 Discovery Circumstances: Numbered Minor Planets (1)-(5000) – Minor Planet Center
 
 

001051
Discoveries by Karl Wilhelm Reinmuth
Named minor planets
19250916